
Schroeder is a North German (from Schröder) occupational name for a cloth cutter or tailor, from an agent derivative of Middle Low German ,  "to cut". The same term was occasionally used to denote a gristmiller as well as a shoemaker, whose work included cutting leather, and also a drayman, one who delivered beer and wine in bulk to customers; in some instances the surname may have been acquired in either of these senses. This name is widespread throughout central and eastern Europe which has been held by many notable people, including:

People

A
 Andrea Schroeder, American politician
 Andreas Schroeder (born 1946), German-born Canadian poet, novelist, and nonfiction writer

B
 Barbet Schroeder (born 1941), Swiss film director and producer
 Bob Schroeder (born 1960), American politician

C
 Carl Schroeder, American composer
 Carly Schroeder (born 1990), American actress
 Christa Schroeder (1908–1984), German secretary

D
 Dominic Schroeder, British diplomat
 Doris Schroeder (1893–1981), American screenwriter
 Dorsey Schroeder (born 1953), American racing driver

F
 Frederick A. Schroeder (1833–1899), German-born American politician
 Frederick C. Schroeder (1910–1980), American politician

G
 Gerald Schroeder, American-Israeli nuclear physicist

H
 Henry F. Schroeder (1874–1959), U.S. Army soldier and Medal of Honor recipient

I
 Irene Schroeder (1909–1931), American criminal

J
 Jamie Schroeder (born 1981), American rower
 Jay Schroeder (born 1961), American football player
 John Schroeder (disambiguation), multiple people

K
 Karl Schroeder (born 1962), Canadian author

L
 Leonard T. Schroeder (1918–2009), U.S. Army colonel, first American soldier ashore on D-Day in World War II 
 Leopold von Schroeder (1851–1920), German indologist
 Louise Schroeder (1887–1957), German politician

M
 Mary M. Schroeder (born 1940), American federal judge
 Michael Schroeder (born 1945), American computer scientist

N
 Nozipho Schroeder (born 1951), South African lawn bowler

P
 Papa Don Schroeder (1940–2019), American music executive
 Pat Schroeder (born 1940), American politician
 Paul W. Schroeder (1927–2020), American historian

R
 Richard Schroeder (born 1961), American swimmer
 Rob Schroeder (1926–2011), American racing driver

S
 Seaton Schroeder (1849–1922), U.S. Navy admiral
 Stassi Schroeder (born 1988), American television personality
 Steven A. Schroeder, American medical professor
 Steven D. Schroeder (born 1977), American poet

T
 Ted Schroeder (1921–2006), American tennis player
 Thomas D. Schroeder (born 1959), American federal judge

V
 Vic Schroeder (born 1944), Canadian politician

W
 Wilhelm Schroeder (1898–1943), German politician
 William Schroeder (disambiguation), multiple people

Fictional characters 
 Schroeder (Peanuts), a character in the comic strip Peanuts by Charles M. Schulz
 Leon von Schroeder, a character in the Yu-Gi-Oh series

Place names 
 Schroeder, Minnesota, United States
 Schroeder Township, Cook County, Minnesota, United States
 Schroeder, Santa Catarina, a town in the state of Santa Catarina, Brazil
 Schroeder, Western Australia, Australia

Other uses 
 Needham–Schroeder protocol, a communications protocol
 , a ship of the US Navy
 Schröder–Bernstein theorem, a mathematical theorem in set theory
 Schroeder (constructor), former racing car constructor
 Schröder number, mathematical sequence

See also 
Schröder

Surnames
Low German surnames
Jewish surnames
Occupational surnames
Surnames of German origin
German-language surnames
Russian Mennonite surnames